John Charles Wilsher (credited as J.C. Wilsher) is an English television screenwriter and playwright, best known for dramas relating to the police and law enforcement such as long-running procedural The Bill. His highest profile work was as creator of Between the Lines, which screened in the UK between 1992 and 1994.

Career
He was a researcher at Lancaster University before taking up his writing career, which began by writing for radio. Over forty years on television, he would contribute to several popular series in various genres, such as New Tricks, Torchwood and Death in Paradise. Wilsher is also a Past President and Deputy Chair of the Writers' Guild of Great Britain (WGGB). In 2022, he will self-publish his memoir, Paper Work: On Being a Writer in Broadcast Drama.

Audio Commentaries
Wilsher has recorded three Audio Commentaries for his The Bill episodes "C.A.D.", "Citadel" and "Workers in Uniform". He is joined for the latter two episodes by actor Chris Humphreys (P.C. Richard Turnham) Released on The Bill Podcast Patreon Channel

Works

Radio Plays
Interval. Starring Eileen Atkins/Edward Woodward (21.1.1964)
Microcosm. Starring Paul Schofield/Eric Allen. Director Ian Cotterill. (24.3.1964)
The Ghosts of the British Museum (1978)
The Fruit of the Vine (1978)
Militaria. Starring Norman Rodway/Gordon Dulieu. (24.2.1979)
Summer School Blues (1980)
A Fair Hearing (1980)
A Victim of the Aurora (adaptation of Thomas Keneally's novel) (1980)
Sunrise Over Baldness (1981)
The Grey Area (1982)
A Pillar of The Society (1983)
Orbital Decay (1984)
Defensible Space (1984)
A Box of Tricks (1985)
A Status Passage (1985)
Fade to black (1987)
In-Flight Entertainment (1991)

Television Screenplays
The Quiz Kid (1979)
Sin with Our Permission (episode of "ITV Playhouse") (1981)
Between the Lines (1992 - 1994) (WGGB Awards for "Original Drama Series", 1993 & 1995; Royal Television Society & Broadcasting Press Guild Awards for "Best Drama Series", 1993; BAFTA Award for "Best Original Drama Series" 1994 )
Silent Witness (episodes) (1996) 
Call Red (1996)
The Vice (Four episodes) (1999 - 2000)
The Bill (53 episodes) (1989 - 2001)
Disposal (episode of "Murder in Mind") (2002)
The Dinosaur Hunters (2002)
Favours (episode of "Murder in Mind") (2003) 
If… Drugs Were Legalised (2005)
Dust Thou Art, Parts 1 & 2 (episodes of Dalziel & Pascoe) (2005)
New Tricks (Seven episodes, (2006-2011) one of which, Diamond Geezers (2006), was co-nominated for the WGGB Award for "Best Soap or Series (Television)".
Torchwood (episode "Reset")
Midsomer Murders (episode: Not In My Backyard)Death in Paradise'' (episode "The Early Bird")

References

External links
Wilsher's Radio Plays

Living people
British television writers
British science fiction writers
English television writers
English screenwriters
English male screenwriters
English dramatists and playwrights
English male dramatists and playwrights
British male television writers
Year of birth missing (living people)